Sarangani is a province in the Philippines. It may also refer to:

 Sarangani Bay
 Sarangani, Davao Occidental, a municipality in the Philippines
 Sarangani Islands, a group of islands comprising the entire municipality of Sarangani, Davao Occidental
 Sarangani Island, one of the islands belonging to the Sarangani Islands
 Sarangani Island, more popularly known as Limasawa Island, Southern Leyte, Philippines
 Sarangani language